The Baltimore St. Gerards were an American soccer club based in Baltimore, Maryland that was a member of the American Soccer League.

Before the 1967/68 season the team was renamed the Baltimore Flyers.

Year-by-year

References

American Soccer League (1933–1983) teams
Flyers
Defunct soccer clubs in Maryland
1966 establishments in Maryland
1968 disestablishments in Maryland
Association football clubs established in 1966
Association football clubs disestablished in 1968